Maastricht Natural History Museum (Dutch: Natuurhistorisch Museum Maastricht)  is a museum of natural history in Maastricht, Netherlands. The museum is located in a former monastery called Grauwzustersklooster (English: Monastery of the Grey Sisters) in the historic district Jekerkwartier in the centre of Maastricht.

The collection is dedicated to the geology, paleontology, flora and fauna of South Limburg. Highlights from the collection are Cretaceous fossils from Sint-Pietersberg, most notably the skull of a Mosasaur (nicknamed "Bèr") and specimens of Hoffmann's giant turtle, Allopleuron hofmanni and Suyckerbuyk's turtle, Glyptochelone suyckerbuyki.
The museum also has a period room with cabinets of curiosities. A remarkable piece from that collection is a rat king from the 19th century.

Behind the museum is a botanical garden, situated on the banks of the small river Jeker.

References

External links 
 
 

Natural history museums in the Netherlands
Museums in Maastricht